Leopoldo Borda Roldán (1898–1977) was a Colombian engineer and career diplomat who served as the 1st Ambassador of Colombia to India. Prior to this inaugural post, he also served as Ambassador of Colombia to Bolivia and held other administrative posts in the foreign service including serving as the 7th Consul General of Colombia in Paris, and served as Chargé d'Affaires for the Colombian missions in Japan, Sweden, and Norway.

Ambassadorship in Bolivia
Borda was named Ambassador of Colombia to Bolivia on 14 September 1957, replacing the exiting Ambassador Rodolfo García y García. He arrived in La Paz later that same year on 26 November taking official charge of the Embassy, and presented his letters of credence to President Hernán Siles Zuazo at the Palacio Quemado.

Ambassadorship in India
In pursuit of grounding the recent established diplomatic relations between Colombia and India on 19 January 1959, President Alberto Lleras Camargo, by means of Decree 1446 of 1959 on 20 May 1959, pronounced the establishment of a diplomatic mission in India at the Embassy level and named Borda as the 1st Ambassador of Colombia to India. Borda arrived in New Delhi on 22 June of the same year; on 27 June he met with Prime Minister Jawaharlal Nehru in an official ceremony, and the next month on 7 July Borda presented his letter of credence to President Rajendra Prasad at the Rashtrapati Bhavan.

References 

People from Bogotá
Colombian diplomats
Ambassadors of Colombia to India
Ambassadors of Colombia to Bolivia
1898 births
1977 deaths